The Funj Sultanate, also known as Funjistan, Sultanate of Sennar (after its capital Sennar) or Blue Sultanate due to the traditional Sudanese convention of referring to black people as blue was a monarchy in what is now Sudan, northwestern Eritrea and western Ethiopia. Founded in 1504 by the Funj people, it quickly converted to Islam, although this embrace was only nominal. Until a more orthodox Islam took hold in the 18th century, the state remained an "African empire with a Muslim façade". It reached its peak in the late 17th century, but declined and eventually fell apart in the 18th and 19th centuries. In 1821, the last sultan, greatly reduced in power, surrendered to the Ottoman Egyptian invasion without a fight.

History

Origins
Christian Nubia, represented by the two medieval kingdoms of Makuria and Alodia, began to decline from the 12th century. By 1365 Makuria had virtually collapsed and was reduced to a petty kingdom restricted to Lower Nubia, until finally disappearing  150 years later. The fate of Alodia is less clear. It has been suggested that it collapsed already as early as the 12th century or shortly after, as archaeology suggests that in this period, Soba ceased to be used as its capital. By the 13th century central Sudan seemed to have disintegrated into various petty states. Between the 14th and 15th centuries Sudan was overran by Bedouin tribes. In the 15th century one of these Bedouins, whom Sudanese traditions refer to as Abdallah Jammah, is recorded to have created a tribal federation and to have subsequently destroyed what was left of Alodia. In the early 16th century Abdallah's federation came under attack of an invader from the south, the Funj.

The ethnic affiliation of the Funj is still disputed. The first and second of the three most prominent theories suggest that they were either Nubians or Shilluk, while, according to the third theory, the Funj were not an ethnic group, but a social class.

In the 14th century a Muslim Funj trader named al-Hajj Faraj al-Funi was involved in the Red Sea trade. According to oral traditions the Dinka, who migrated upstream the White and Blue Nile since the 13th-century disintegration of Alodia, came in conflict with the Funj, who the Dinka defeated. In the late 15th/early 16th century the Shilluk arrived at the junction of the Sobat and the White Nile, where they encountered a sedentary people Shilluk traditions refer to as Apfuny, Obwongo and/or Dongo, a people now equated with the Funj. Said to be more sophisticated than the Shilluk, they were defeated in a series of brutal wars and either assimilated or pushed north. Anti-Funj propaganda from the later period of the kingdom referred to the Funj as "pagans from the White Nile" and "barbarians" who had originated from the "primitive southern swamps".

In 1504 the Funj defeated Abdallah Jammah and founded the Funj sultanate.

Ottoman threat and revolt of Ajib

In 1523 the kingdom was visited by Jewish traveller David Reubeni, who disguised himself as a Sharif. Sultan Amara Dunqas, Reubeni wrote, was continuously travelling through his kingdom. He, who "ruled over black people and white" between the region south of the Nile confluence to as far north as Dongola, owned large herds of various types of animals and commanded many captains on horseback. Two years later, Ottoman admiral Selman Reis mentioned Amara Dunqas and his kingdom, calling it weak and easily conquerable. He also stated that Amara paid an annual tribute of 9.000 camels to the Ethiopian Empire. One year later the Ottomans occupied Sawakin, which beforehand was associated with Sennar. It seems that to counter the Ottoman expansion in the Red Sea region, the Funj engaged in an alliance with Ethiopia. Besides camels the Funj are known to have exported horses to Ethiopia, which were then used in war against the Muslims of Zeila and later, when they tried to expand their domains in Ethiopia, the Ottomans.

Before the Ottomans got a foothold in Ethiopia, in 1555, Özdemir Pasha was appointed Beylerbey of the (yet to be conquered) Habesh Eyalet. He attempted to march upstream along the Nile to conquer the Funj, but his troops revolted when they approached the first Nile cataract. Until 1570, however, the Ottomans had established themselves in Qasr Ibrim in Lower Nubia, most likely a preemptive move to secure Upper Egypt from Funj aggression. Fourteen years later they had pushed as far south as the third Nile cataract and subsequently attempted to conquer Dongola, but, in 1585, were crushed by the Funj at the battle of Hannik. Afterwards, the battlefield, which was located just south of the third Nile cataract, would mark the border between the two kingdoms. In the late 16th century the Funj pushed towards the neighbourhood of the Habesh Eyalet, conquering north-western Eritrea. Failing to make progress against both the Funj sultanate and Ethiopia, the Ottomans abandoned their policy of expansion. Thus, from the 1590s onwards, the Ottoman threat vanished, rendering the Funj-Ethiopian alliance unnecessary, and relations between the two states were about to turn into open hostility soon. As late as 1597, however, the relations were still described as friendly, with trade being a flourishing matter.

In the meantime, the rule of sultan Dakin (1568–1585) saw the rise of Ajib, a minor king of northern Nubia. When Dakin returned from a failed campaign in the Ethiopian-Sudanese borderlands Ajib had acquired enough power to demand and receive greater political autonomy. A few years later he forced sultan Tayyib to marry his daughter, effectively making Tayyib and his offspring and successor, Unsa, his vassals. Unsa was eventually deposed in 1603/1604 by Abd al-Qadir II, triggering Ajib to invade the very Funj heartland. His armies pushed the Funj king to the south-east. Thus, Ajib effectively ruled over an empire reaching from Dongola to Ethiopia. Abd el-Qadir II, eventually deposed in December 1606, fled to Ethiopia and submitted to emperor Susenyos, providing Susenyos with an opportunity to intervene in the sultanate's affairs. However, the new Funj sultan, Adlan I, managed to turn the tide of war against Ajib, eventually killing him in 1611 or 1612. While chasing the remnants of Ajib's army to the north, Adlan II himself was deposed and succeeded by a son of the former sultan Abd al-Qadir II, Badi I. He issued a peace treaty with the sons of Ajib, agreeing to factually split the Funj state. The successors of Ajib, the Abdallab, would receive everything north of the confluence of Blue and White Nile, which they would rule as vassal kings of Sennar. Therefore, the Funj lost direct control over much of their kingdom.

17th century peak

The submission of Abd al-Qadir II to the Ethiopian emperor and the possibility of a consequential invasion remained a problem for the Funj sultans. Adlan I had apparently been too weak to do something against this situation, but Badi I was able to take matters into his own hands. A rich present by Susenyos, which he perhaps sent in the belief that the successors of Abd al-Qadir II would honour the submission of the latter, was rudely answered with two lame horses and first raids of Ethiopian posts. Susenyos, occupied elsewhere, would not respond to that act of aggression until 1617 when he raided several Funj provinces. This mutual raiding finally escalated in a full-fledged war in 1618 and 1619, resulting in the devastation of many of the Funj eastern provinces. A pitched battle was also fought, claimed by the Ethiopian sources to have been a victory, albeit this is posed doubtful by the fact that the Ethiopian troops retreated immediately afterwards. After the war, the two countries remained at peace for over a century.

The Funj sultan who ruled during the war, Rabat I, was the first in a series of three monarchs under whom the sultanate entered a period of prosperity, expansion and increased contacts with the outside world, but was also confronted with several new problems.

In the 17th century, the Shilluk and Sennar were forced into an uneasy alliance to combat the growing might of the Dinka. After the alliance had run its cause, in 1650, Sultan Badi II occupied the northern half of the Shilluk Kingdom. Under his rule the Funj defeated the Kingdom of Taqali to the west and made its ruler his vassal.

Decline

Sennar was at its peak at the end of the 17th century, but during the 18th century, it began to decline as the power of the monarchy was eroded. The greatest challenge to the authority of the king were the merchant funded Ulama who insisted it was rightfully their duty to mete out justice.

In about 1718 the previous dynasty, the Unsab, was overthrown in a coup and replaced by Nul, who, although related to the previous Sultan, effectively founded a dynasty on his own. 

In 1741 and 1743 young Ethiopian emperor Iyasu II conducted first raids westwards, attempting to acquire quick military fame. In March 1744 he assembled an army of 30,000–100,000 men for a new expedition, which was initially intended as yet another raid, but soon turned into a war of conquest. On the banks of the Dinder river the two states fought a pitched battle, which went in favour of Sennar. Iyasu II, traveller James Bruce noted, plundered his way back to Ethiopia, allowing him to display his campaign as a success. Meanwhile, Badi IV's repulsion of the Ethiopian invasion made him a national hero. Hostilities between the two states continued until the end of Iyasu II's reign in 1755, tensions caused by this war were still recorded in 1773. Trade, however, soon resumed after the conflict, although on reduced scale.

It has been suggested that it was Badi's victory over the Ethiopians that strengthened his power; in 1743/4 he is known to have had his vizier executed and to have taken the reins. He attempted to create a new power base by purging the previous ruling clan, stripping the nobility of their land and instead empowering clients from the western and southern periphery of his realm. One of these clients was Muhammad Abu Likayik, a Hamaj (a generic Sudannese term applied to the pre-Funj, non-Arabic or semi-Arabized people of the Gezira and Ethiopian-Sudanese borderlands) from east of Fazughli who was granted land immediately south of Sennar in 1747/8. He was a cavalry commander tasked to pacify Kordofan, which had become a battlefield between the Funj and the Musabb’at, refugees from the Sultanate of Darfur. The Fur had the upper hand until 1755, when Abu Likayik finally managed to overrun Kordofan and turn it into his new powerbase. In the meantime, Sultan Badi grew increasingly unpopular due to his repressive measures. Eventually, Abu Likayik was convinced by disaffected Funj noblemen, many of them residing in Kordofan, to march on the capital. In 1760/1761 he reached Alays at the White Nile, where a council was held in which Badi was formally deposed. Afterwards, he besieged Sennar, which he entered on 27 March 1762. Badi fled to Ethiopia but was murdered in 1763. Thus began the Hamaj Regency, where the Funj monarchs became puppets of the Hamaj.

Abu Likayik installed another member of the royal family as his puppet sultan and ruled as regent. This began a long conflict between the Funj sultans attempting to reassert their independence and authority and the Hamaj regents attempting to maintain control of the true power of the state. These internal divisions greatly weakened the state and in the late 18th century Mek Adlan II, son of Mek Taifara, took power during a turbulent time at which a Turkish presence was being established in the Funj kingdom. The Turkish ruler, Al-Tahir Agha, married Khadeeja, daughter of Mek Adlan II. This paved the way for the assimilation of the Funj into the Ottoman Empire.

The later 18th century saw a rapid disintegration of the Funj state. In 1785/6 the Fur Sultanate conquered Kordofan which it managed to hold until the Egyptian invasion of 1821. In the second half of the 18th century Sennar lost the Tigre in what is now Eritrea to the rising naib ("deputy") of Massawa, while after 1791 Taka around the Sudanese Mareb River made itself independent. The Shukriya became the new dominant power in the Butana. After 1802, the authority of the sultanate was limited to the Gezira for good. In the early years of the 19th century the kingdom was plagued by excessive civil wars. Regent Muhammad Adlan, who rose to power in 1808 and whose father had been assassinated by a warlord of that period, was able to put an end to these wars and managed to stabilize the kingdom for another 13 years.

In 1820, Ismail bin Muhammad Ali, the general and son of the nominally Ottoman vassal Muhammad Ali Pasha, started the conquest of Sudan. Realizing that the Turks were about to conquer his domain, Muhammad Adlan prepared to resist and ordered to muster the army at the Nile confluence, but he fell to a plot near Sennar in early 1821. One of the murderers, a man named Daf'Allah, rode back to the capital to prepare Sultan Badi VII's submission ceremony to the Turks. The Turks reached the Nile confluence in May 1821. Afterwards, they travelled upstream the Blue Nile until reaching Sennar. They were disappointed to learn that Sennar, once enjoying a reputation of wealth and splendour, was now reduced to a heap of ruins. On 14 June they received the official submission of Badi VII.

Government

Administration

The sultans of Sennar were powerful, but not absolutely so, as a council of 20 elders also had a say in state decisions. Below the king stood the chief minister, the amin, and the jundi, who supervised the market and acted as commander of the state police and intelligence service. Another high court official was the sid al-qum, a royal bodyguard and executioner. Only he was allowed to shed royal blood, as he was tasked to kill all brothers of a freshly elected king to prevent civil wars.

The state was divided into several provinces governed by a manjil. Each of these province was again divided into sub-provinces governed by a makk, each of them subordinated to their respective manjil. The most important manjil was the one of the Abdallabs, followed by Alays at the White Nile, the kings of the Blue Nile region and finally the rest. The king of Sennar exercised his influence among the manjils forcing them to marry a woman from the royal clan, which acted as royal spies. A member of the royal clan also always sat at their side, observing their behaviour. Furthermore, the manjils had to travel to Sennar every year to pay tribute and account for their deeds.

It was under king Badi II when Sennar became the fixed capital of the state and when written documents concerning administrative matters appeared, with the oldest known one dating to 1654.

Military

The army of Sennar was feudal. Each noble house could field a military unit measured in its power by its horsemen. Subjects, although generally armed, were only rarely called to war, in cases of uttermost need. Most Funj warriors were slaves traditionally captured in annual slave raids called salatiya, targeting the stateless non-Muslims in the Nuba mountains pejoratively referred to as Fartit. The army was divided into the infantry, represented by an official called muqaddam al-qawawid, as well as the cavalry, represented by the muqaddam al-khayl. The Sultan only rarely led armies into battle and instead appointed a commander for the duration of the campaign, called amin jaysh al-sultan. Nomadic warriors fighting for the Funj had an own appointed leader, the aqid or qa’id.

The weaponry of the Funj warriors consisted of thrusting lances, throwing knives, javelins, hide shields and, most importantly, long broadswords which could be wielded two-handed. Body armour consisted of leather or quilts and additionally mail, while the hands were protected by leather gloves. On the heads, there were worn iron or copper helmets. The horses were also armoured, wearing thick quilts, copper headgear and breast plates. While armour was also manufactured locally, it was at times imported as well. During the late 17th century Sultan Badi III attempted to modernize the army by importing firearms and even cannons, but they were quickly disregarded after his death not only because the import was expensive and unreliable, but also because the traditionally armed elites feared for their power. In the early 1770s James Bruce remarked that the Sultan had "not one musket in his whole army".

One time a year Sennar conducted a slave-raid against the regions to its south and south-west.

The Funj made use of Shilluk and Dinka mercenaries.

Culture

Religion

Islam

By the time of the visit by David Reubeni in 1523, the Funj, originally Pagans or syncretic Christians, had converted to Islam. They probably converted to ease their rule over their Muslim subjects and to facilitate trade with neighbouring countries like Egypt. Their embracement of Islam was, however, only nominal and, in fact, the Funj effectively even delayed the Islamization of Nubia, as they temporarily strengthened African sacral traditions instead. The monarchy they established was divine, similar to that of many other African states: The Funj Sultan had hundreds of wives and spent most of his reign within the palace, secluded from his subjects and maintaining contact only with a handful of officials. He was not allowed to be seen eating. On the rare occasion he appeared in public he did so only with a veil and accompanied by much pomp. The Sultan was judged regularly and, if found wanting, could be executed. All Funj, but especially the Sultan, were believed to be able to detect sorcery. Islamic talismans written in Sennar were believed to have special powers due to the proximity to the Sultan. Among the populace even the basics of Islamic faith were not widely known.  Pork and beer were consumed as staple food throughout much of the kingdom, the death of an important individual would be mourned by "communal dancing, self-mutilation and rolling in the ashes of the feast-fire". At least in some regions, elderly, crippled and others who believed to be a burden for their relatives and friends were expected to request to be buried alive or otherwise disposed. As late as the late 17th century the Funj Sultanate was still recorded to not follow the "laws of the Turks”, i. e. Islam. Thus, until the 18th century Islam was not much more than a facade.

Despite this, the Funj acted as sponsors of Islam from the very beginning, encouraging the settlement of Muslim holy men in their domain. In the later period civil wars forced the peasants to look to the holy men for protection; the sultans lost the peasant population to the Ulama.

Christianity

The collapse of the Christian Nubian states went hand in hand with the collapse of the Christian institutions. The Christian faith, however, would continue to exist, although gradually declining. By the sixteenth century large portions of Nubia's population would still have been Christian. Dongola, the former capital and Christian center of the Makurian kingdom, was recorded to have been largely Islamized by the turn of the 16th century, although a Franciscan letter confirms the existence of a community immediately south of Dongola practicing a "debased Christianity" as late as 1742. According to the 1699 account of Poncet, Muslims reacted to meeting Christians in the streets of Sennar by reciting the Shahada. The Fazughli region seems to have been Christian at least for one generation after its conquest in 1685; a Christian principality was mentioned in the region as late as 1773. The Tigre in north-western Eritrea, who were part of the Beni Amer confederation, remained Christians until the 19th century.
Rituals stemming from Christian traditions outlived the conversion to Islam and were still practiced as late as the 20th century.

From the 17th century foreign Christian groups, mostly merchants, were present in Sennar, including Copts, Ethiopians, Greeks, Armenians and Portuguese. The sultanate also served as interstation for Ethiopian Christians travelling to Egypt and the Holy Land as well as European missionaries travelling to Ethiopia.

Languages

In the Christian period, Nubian languages had been spoken between the region from Aswan in the north to an undetermined point south of the confluence of the Blue and White Nile. They remained important during the Funj period, but were gradually superseded by Arabic, a process accomplished in central Sudan by the 19th century.

After the Funj conversion to Islam, Arabic grew to become the lingua franca of administration and trade while also being employed as language of religion. While the royal court would continue to speak their pre-Arabic language for some time by  1700, the language of communication at the court had become Arabic. In the 18th century, Arabic became the written language of state administration. As late as 1821, when the kingdom fell, some provincial noblemen were still not capable of speaking Arabic. Evliya Çelebi (17th century) and Joseph Russegger (mid 19th century) described a pre-Arabic language in the Funj heartland. Çelebi provided a listing of numerals as well as a poem, both written in Arabic script; the numerals are clearly Kanuri, while the language used for the poem remains unidentified. Russegger stated that a Fungi language, sounding similar to Nubian and having absorbed many Arabic words, was spoken as far north as Khartoum, albeit already reduced to a secondary role compared to Arabic. In Kordofan, Nubian was still spoken as primary or at least secondary language as late as the 1820s and 1830s.

Trade
During the reign of sultan Badi III in the late 17th and early 18th century the prosperous and cosmopolitan capital of Sennar was described as "close to being the greatest trading city" in all Africa. The wealth and power of the sultans had long rested on the control of the economy.  All caravans were controlled by the monarch, as was the gold supply that functioned as the state's main currency. Important revenues came from customs dues levied on the caravan routers leading to Egypt and the Red Sea ports and on the pilgrimage traffic from the Western Sudan. In the late 17th century the Funj had opened up trading with the Ottoman Empire.  In the late 17th century with the introduction of coinage, an unregulated market system took hold, and the sultans lost control of the market to a new merchant middle class. Foreign currencies became widely used by merchants breaking the power of the monarch to closely control the economy.  The thriving trade created a wealthy class of educated and literate merchants, who read widely about Islam and became much concerned about the lack of orthodoxy in the kingdom.
The Sultanate also did their best to monopolize the slave trade to Egypt, most notably through the annual caravan of up to one thousand slaves. This monopoly was most successful in the seventeenth century, although it still worked to some extent in the eighteenth.

Rulers
The rulers of Sennar held the title of Mek (sultan). Their regnal numbers vary from source to source.

Amara Dunqas 1503-1533/4 (AH 940)
Nayil 1533/4 (AH 940)-1550/1 (AH 957)
Abd al-Qadir I 1550/1 (AH 957)-1557/8 (AH 965)
Abu Sakikin 1557/8 (AH 965)-1568
Dakin 1568-1585/6 (AH 994)
Dawra 1585/6 (AH 994)-1587/8 (AH 996)
Tayyib 1587/8 (AH 996)-1591
Unsa I 1591-1603/4 (AH 1012)
Abd al-Qadir II 1603/4 (AH 1012)-1606
Adlan I 1606-1611/2 (AH 1020)
Badi I 1611/2 (AH 1020)-1616/7 (AH 1025)
Rabat I 1616/7 (AH 1025)-1644/5
Badi II 1644/5-1681
Unsa II 1681–1692
Badi III 1692–1716
Unsa III 1719–1720
Nul 1720–1724
Badi IV 1724–1762
Nasir 1762–1769
Isma'il 1768–1776
Adlan II 1776–1789
Awkal 1787–1788
Tayyib II 1788–1790
Badi V 1790
Nawwar 1790–1791
Badi VI 1791–1798
Ranfi 1798–1804
Agban 1804–1805
Badi VII 1805–1821

Hamaj regents

Muhammad Abu Likayik – 1769–1775/6
Badi walad Rajab – 1775/6–1780
Rajab 1780–1786/7
Nasir 1786/7–1798
Idris wad Abu Likayik – 1798–1803
Adlan wad Abu Likayik – 1803
Wad Rajab – 1804–1806

Maps

See also
 Funj Chronicle
 List of Sunni Muslim dynasties

Annotations

References

Bibliography

Further reading
 Robinson, Arthur E. "Some Notes on the Regalia of the Fung Sultans of Sennar", Journal of the Royal African Society, 30 (1931), pp. 361–376

States and territories established in 1504
States and territories disestablished in 1821
Countries in precolonial Africa
History of Sudan
Sennar, Kingdom of
1504 establishments in Africa
1821 disestablishments in Africa
Muslim dynasties
Former sultanates
Sahelian kingdoms
Former countries
Lists of African monarchs